The Kashubian or Cassubian alphabet (kaszëbsczi alfabét, kaszëbsczé abecadło)  is the script of the Kashubian language, based on the Latin alphabet. The Kashubian alphabet consists of 34 letters:

A, Ą, Ã, B, C, D, E, É, Ë, F, G, H, I, J, K, L, Ł, M, N, Ń, O, Ò, Ó, Ô, P, R, S, T, U, Ù, W, Y, Z, Ż

The Kashubian language also uses some digraphs: ch, cz, dz, dż, rz and sz. The digraphs cz, dż, sz, ż are pronounced in a different manner from their Polish counterparts – they are palato-alveolar, not retroflex – but rz is pronounced the same as in Polish.

Pronunciation

Consonants combination

Literature 
 Eugeniusz Gòłąbk: Wkôzë kaszëbsczégò pisënkù. Oficyna Czec, Gduńsk 1997, p. 25 .

See also
Ł-l merger
 Polish language

References

External links 
 Omniglot
 Kaszëbskô Mowa: Freeing the Kashubian Language

Alphabet
Latin alphabets